Erika Nonhlanhla Seyama (born 19 January 1994) is a Swazi athlete specialising in the high jump. She won a gold medal at the 2018 African Championships in Asaba.

Her personal best is 1.83 metres set in Asaba in 2018.

Competition record

References

1994 births
Living people
Swazi female high jumpers
Athletes (track and field) at the 2018 Commonwealth Games
Commonwealth Games competitors for Eswatini
Swazi expatriates in South Africa
African Championships in Athletics winners
Competitors at the 2017 Summer Universiade